Suleiman Sadiq Umar (born 8 June 1970) is the Senator in Nigeria's National Assembly, representing Kwara State, Nigeria. He is also representing All Progressive Congress (APC). He became the Senator that was sworn in for Kwara North Senatorial District. He is 173cm tall with a weight of 90kg

References 

1970 births
Living people
Nigerian politicians
All Progressives Congress politicians